Virobay is an American pharmaceutical company which develops drugs using a proprietary cysteine cathepsin platform.

References

Companies based in Menlo Park, California
Pharmaceutical companies of the United States
Health care companies based in California